Cyperus lacunosus is a species of sedge that is native to western parts of Cuba.

See also 
 List of Cyperus species

References 

lacunosus
Plants described in 1866
Flora of Cuba
Taxa named by August Grisebach
Flora without expected TNC conservation status